Jeroen Appeltans (born 27 August 1990) is a professional footballer who plays for Herk FC.

Career 
He made his debut for STVV as a replacement in the  2006–2007 season against Lierse at the age of 16. He only saw action twice during this season. In the 2007–2008 season he suffered a muscle injury. In 2008–2009 he played five times. The midfielder played in the Season 2010/2011 on loan for K.V.K. Tienen and KSC Grimbergen from STVV out Sint-Truiden.

References

 

Belgian footballers
1990 births
Living people
Sint-Truidense V.V. players
K.V.K. Tienen-Hageland players
K.V.V. Thes Sport Tessenderlo players
Association football midfielders
People from Sint-Truiden
Footballers from Limburg (Belgium)